Henry McKelvey Blodget (born 1966) is an American businessman, investor and journalist. He is notable for his former career as an equity research analyst who was senior Internet analyst for CIBC Oppenheimer and the head of the global Internet research team at Merrill Lynch during the dot-com era.  Due to his violations of securities laws and subsequent civil trial conviction, Blodget is permanently banned from involvement in the securities industry. Blodget is the CEO of Business Insider.

Early life and education
Blodget was born and raised on Manhattan's Upper East Side, the son of a commercial banker.  He attended Phillips Exeter Academy and received a Bachelor of Arts degree in history from Yale University, where he was a member of The Society of Orpheus and Bacchus.

After college, he taught English in Japan, then moved to San Francisco to be a writer while supporting himself by giving tennis lessons.  He was also a freelance journalist and a proofreader for Harper's Magazine.

Investment career
In 1994, Blodget joined the corporate finance training program at Prudential Securities, and, two years later, moved to Oppenheimer & Co. in equity research. In October 1998, he predicted that the common stock of Amazon, AMZN (then trading at $240) would be priced at $400 within a year. This was thought highly unlikely at the time; however, just three weeks later Amazon's stock price passed that mark, a gain of 67%. This call received significant media attention. Two months later, Blodget accepted a position at Merrill Lynch, and frequently appeared on CNBC and similar shows.

In early 2000, days before the dot-com bubble burst, Blodget personally invested $700,000 in tech stocks, only to lose most of it in the years that followed. He accepted a buyout offer from Merrill Lynch and left the firm in 2001.

Fraud allegation and settlement
In 2002, then New York State Attorney General Eliot Spitzer published Merrill Lynch e-mails in which Blodget gave assessments about stocks which conflicted with what was publicly published. In 2003, he was charged with civil securities fraud by the U.S. Securities and Exchange Commission. He agreed to a permanent ban from the securities industry and paid a $2 million fine plus a $2 million disgorgement.

Writing
Following his departure from the financial markets, Blodget resumed his career as a financial and economics writer. He was appointed CEO of Cherry Hill Research, a research and consulting firm, and contributed to Slate, Newsweek International, The New York Times, Fortune, Forbes Online, Business 2.0, Euromoney, New York magazine, and The Financial Times.

Blodget rose to prominence again as co-founder, CEO, and editor-in-chief of Business Insider (initially known as Silicon Alley Insider) in 2007. He was also a frequent contributor to the Seeking Alpha website at the same time. While CEO and owner of Business Insider, he offered free reproduction of all content to readers under Creative Commons licensing. In 2014, Jeffrey Bezos purchased a stake in Business Insider.
 
As of 2017, Blodget remains the CEO and editor-in-chief of Business Insider, now a general news website. He continues to contribute articles to Slate, Newsweek, and New York magazine. Blodget's articles focus on the return-limiting actions of individual investors, including listening to analysts and the financial media, and relying on active management such as mutual and hedge funds. His Slate articles about investing carry a seven-paragraph disclosure of potential conflicts of interest.

In January 2007, Blodget published The Wall Street Self-Defense Manual: A Consumer's Guide to Intelligent Investing in January 2007.

Internet broadcaster
Blodget used to co-host the Daily-Ticker broadcast with Aaron Task weekdays at Yahoo! Finance.

Bibliography
 The Wall Street Self-Defense Manual: A Consumer's Guide to Intelligent Investing. Atlas Books, 2007. .

References

Further reading

External links

Silicon Alley Insider Henry Blodget's multi-author technology blog

Business Insider Blodget is currently editor of Business Insider
   – Promotional site for Blodget's first book.

1966 births
Living people
American financial analysts
American finance and investment writers
American fraudsters
American mass media company founders
American technology writers
Businesspeople in information technology
Businesspeople from New York City
Journalists from New York City
Merrill (company) people
People from the Upper East Side
Phillips Exeter Academy alumni
Slate (magazine) people
Writers from Manhattan
Yale College alumni
American chief executives